Kozani is a city in northern Greece, capital of Kozani regional unit and of Western Macedonia. It is located in the western part of Macedonia, in the northern part of the Aliakmonas river valley. The population of the Kozani municipality is over 70,000 people. The climate of the area is continental with cold and dry winters, and hot summers.

Kozani is the home of the University of Western Macedonia, with about 15,000 students from all over Greece and other places. It is also the seat of West Macedonia's court of appeal, police department, fire brigade, the seat of the 1st Army Corps of the Hellenic Army and of the Bishop of Servia and Kozani.

One of the most important aspects of local folklore is Kozani's carnival at the end of the winter, which retains much of the profanity of the ancient Dionysiac cult. Kozani is renowned in Greece and abroad for the production of saffron (Krokos Kozanis), in the nearby town of Krokos.

Kozani is a transport node between Central Macedonia, Thessaly and Epirus. The nearest airport is Filippos Airport,  from the city, IATA code: KZI. The airport was first opened in the mid-20th century. Kozani is situated near the Egnatia Highway, which connects the coast of the Ionian Sea with Thessaloniki and Turkish borders.

Etymology

According to prevailing opinion in Greece, the name comes from the village of Epirus Kósdiani, the origin of settlers of Kozani in 1392. The settlement was first named Kózdiani, which then, it was changed into Kóziani, and in the end into Kozáni.

History

Antiquity
Antiquities from the prehistoric to the Byzantine period have been unearthed in many sectors of the city. In the east part of Kozani, an ancient necropolis has been found, dating to the early Iron Age. During Philip II of Macedon's reign, the region was named Elimeia, which was part of Upper Macedonia and probably in the same place there was a town named Tyrissa. In the south-west of the modern city, on Siopoto hill, there was a settlement named Kalyvia, between 1100 and 1300, traces of which are still preserved.

Ottoman period
Kozani was probably founded by Christian settlers who, after the Ottoman conquest, withdrew from the plains of Macedonia into the mountains, during the 14th and 15th centuries. Its secure position soon attracted other Christians expelled from Epirus, in 1392. Together with the settlers from Epirus, many cattle-breeders moved in the region.

The first recorded mention of Kozani is in an Ottoman register of 1528, as a settlement with 91 houses, 23 singles and 15 widows. One of the most important colonizers of Kozani was the chief shepherd Ioannis Trantas, who settled about 100 families. His son, Charisios Trantas, managed to obtain a Sultan's firman in 1664, according to the terms of which the town came under the protection of the Sultan's mother, was endowed with many privileges, and became forbidden for the Turks to settle in.

In 1664, the magnificent church of Agios Nikolaos was built. In 1668, the library and the famous school of Kozani were founded. During the 17th and 18th century, commercial relations with the countries of central Europe gave the opportunity for the city to flourish economically. During the 19th century, as foreign travellers relate, the population of the town was Greek, and was growing (Leake 1835:305 and Bouè 1854:87).

The town's growth was disrupted in 1770, because of conflict that erupted between Kozani's local inhabitants and Kozanite merchants in central Europe, who contributed to the town's prosperity; even more catastrophically, the city was pillaged by Turkish beys in 1770. A subsequent incursion by Aslan bey, in 1830, ravaged the city immensely. In 1855 next to St. Nicholas Church a 26 meters high bell tower was built, which would become the symbol of the city. In 1939, a clock was added to the top of the tower, donated by Greek-American, Konstantinos Mamatsios. According to the 1904 population census, 12,000 Greeks and 350 Aromanians (Vlachs) were living in Kozani at the time.

In the late 19th and early 20th century, Kozani was part of the Manastir Vilayet of the Ottoman Empire.

Balkan wars

The Greek army entered Kozani on 11 October 1912, during the First Balkan War, after its victory against the Ottoman army in the Battle of Sarantaporo. By this time, the population of the town was 12,000 Orthodox Greeks. In 1923, during the population exchange between Greece and Turkey, about 1,400 Greek families from Pontus and Asia Minor were settled in Kozani.

Modern times

In the 20th century, the city grew tremendously, as lignite reserves in the area started being used by Public Power Corporation, making Kozani the foremost producer of electrical power in Greece. An earthquake that occurred in the region on 13 May 1995, with a magnitude of 6.6 on the Richter scale, caused only property damage.

The city now combines modern with old architecture. Some magnificent buildings are the clock tower, the town hall, the folklore museum, the "Valtadoreio" Gymnasium, the National Bank of Greece building, the "Ermioneion" Hotel and the mansions of Georgios Lassanis and Grigorios Vourkas. The Municipal Library of Kozani called "Kovendareios" is the second biggest in Greece, and it has 150,000 books, rare publications, valuable documents, and one of the rare copies of Rigas Feraios' charter. For this reason Kozani was included in the National Cultural Network of Cities with object the promotion of the Book and Reading. The Institute of Book and Reading was established and Kozani is now known as City of Books. Today Kozani is the administrative, commercial, economic, and transport centre of the region of West Macedonia.

Economy

The city is mostly known for its important contribution to the Greek electricity supply, and a large part of the population works in the Public Power Corporation's lignite-fired Agios Dimitrios Power Plant, the largest power plant in Greece. The Ptolemaida Basin hosts the Western Macedonia Lignite Center, which is accountable for the production of 40% of the electric energy of the country.

Other famous products are marble, saffron (Krokos, Kozanis), fruits, local wines and specialized arts and crafts industry. The Commercial Exhibition of Kozani takes part in the Exhibition Centre of Western Macedonia in Koila Kozanis every September. Many firms from Greece and other Balkan countries participate, especially with local products.

While Kozani remains a regional banking center, the Kozani-based Co-Operative Bank of Western Macedonia however failed the stress test conducted by the Bank of Greece and subsequently was liquidated in December 2013.

Sites of interest

Downtown sites of interest
The Archaeological Museum of Kozani
The Historical–Folklore and Natural History Museum of Kozani is a place worth visiting. It is built according to old Macedonian architecture, and in its 6 floors, visitors can see everything about the geography, natural history, flora and animals of the region, as well as the history, the traditions and the past way of life in Kozani.
The Museum of Modern Local History of Kozani
The clock tower and the church of Agios Nikolaos - 350 years old - in Nikis Square.
Other attractions include the Grigorios Vourkas Mansion and the Georgios Lassanis Mansion. The second one lies in a central square, named Lassani Square and it is used as the Municipal Map Library.

Nearby sites of interest
The Municipal Park Kouri located in Agios Dimitrios where you can see the Cultural Center and the Municipal Theatre of Kozani, and the hill of Xenia with the nice view of all the city
The Museum of the Macedonian Struggle in Chromio, a museum dedicated to the history of the Macedonian Struggle.
Polyphytos bridge crossing the artificial Polyphytos lake.

Mass media
There are some telecommunications companies, TV and radio stations, newspapers, magazines, and web portals based in Kozani. The television channels are West Channel, TOP Channel and Flash TV. Top-circulation newspapers include Chronos, Grammi, and Tharros.

Historical population

Transport

Kozani is accessed with Motorway Egnatia (or GR-2, or E90) from Ioannina and Thessaloniki, GR-3 (or E65) from Larissa and Florina, GR-4 and GR-20.
By bus, (KTEL Kozanis) for all West Macedonian towns and for the biggest Greek cities Athens (4 times/day - 470 km), Thessaloniki (every hour - 120 km), Larisa (120 km), Volos, Ioannina (160 km), Patras.

The public transit in the city is provided by minibuses, and between the centre and the municipal departments, it is provided by Transit buses. The traffic problems of the city have become more severe during the last few years.

Government

The municipality Kozani was formed at the 2011 local government reform by the merger of the following five former municipalities, that became municipal units:

The total population is 71,388 (2011). It is developing into a nodal town of the Western Balkans, with areas and activities of a wider regional nature. Within this context, the municipality of Kozani is creating a modern satellite town, the Kozani Zone of Alternate Urban Planning (ZEP). The Municipal Corporation of alternate planning and development of Kozani S.A.(DEPEPOK) was established in order to implement the projects of the ZEP.

The ZEP is strategically located on 50 ha south-west of Kozani, and aims to become a model development centre, attracting an urban population and economic activities from throughout Western Macedonia in Greece and the Western Balkans.

Other known neighborhoods of Kozani are Sk'rka, Ipirotika, Gitia, Agios Athanasios, Platania.

Province
The province of Kozani was one of the provinces of the Kozani Prefecture. Its territory corresponded with that of the current municipalities Kozani (except a few villages that were part of the Eordaia province) and Servia-Velventos. It was abolished in 2006.

Climate
Under the Köppen climate classification, Kozani has a humid subtropical climate (Cfa). Rainfall is spread evenly throughout the year.

Education

There are 18 Primary schools in Kozani, and another 8, in the municipal departments of Vatero, Kariditsa, Koila, Lefkovrysi, Lefkopigi, Nea Charavgi, Xirolimni and Petrana. The Gymnasiums of the city are 8, and there are two more in the municipal departments of Lefkopigi and Xirolimni. There are also 4 Lyceums, 4 Technical Schools (TEE), some Business Schools and one municipal Odeum.

The city is the seat of the University of Western Macedonia which has 7 Faculties and 22 Departments in 5 cities (Kozani, Florina, Kastoria, Ptolemaida, and Grevena). The main campus is located in Kila, Kozani. The university was founded in 2002.

Culture

Festivals and events
Kozani carnival is one of the most important events in the region, taking place at the end of winter. The dates change each year, depending on the start date of Lent. Carnival festivities in Kozani, and generally in Greece, last eleven days, starting on Tsikopempti (: Grassy Thursday, equivalent to Mardi Gras) and ending on Kathara Deftera (: Clean Monday, equivalent to Ash Wednesday).

During the Kozani carnival, great bonfires are lit in different parts of the city; every night, another district lights its fire and people dance around it; on the last night of the carnival, all fires are lit. These festive fires, as well as the cultural associations that organize the festivities in each district, are called Fanoi (fires). Each fanos welcomes visitors and locals to their district with songs and dances, and treats them to local delicacies, namely kichia (feta cheese wrapped around a snail-shaped phyllo) and meatballs, as well as wine. Popular songs are sung around the fire, with the singers and crowd dancing in a primitive way that sees repeating the same steps and gestures; at midnight, scatological and explicit songs are sung. In between songs, bands play instrumental songs, such as the Enteka, often called Kozani's "national anthem". It is worth nothing that all of these festivities are executed in the city's dialect, Kozani Greek.

In 2010, Theodoros Lakkas, one of the most prominent figures of the fanoi, lead singer of the fanos Lakkos t' maggan and writer of funny short stories, published the first anthology of Kozani's carnival songs, entitled Ivgati Agoria m stou chouro [Go dance, my boys]. This has been the first attempt so far to collect all the songs in one volume.

At the end of summer Lassaneia Events are organised. They consist of theatrical representations, concerts, athletic events etc. The name "Lassaneia" comes from Georgios Lassanis, who was from Kozani and participated in the Greek War of Independence. A part of those events is also the new authors song festival "Nikolas Asimos".

Niaimeros is a fair in the north of the city in the Niaimeros place. It takes place on the first Tuesday of October. It used to last 9 days (niaimeros = nine days), but now it lasts only 3 days.

Official local public holidays are the celebration for the liberation of the city from the Turks on 11 October and Saint Nicolas day - Kozani's patron - on 6 December.

The municipal Band is named Pandora. It was founded in 1902, and it takes part in all the events and celebrations.

Cuisine

A typical dish in Kozani is the so-called Yaprákia. The main ingredients are meat and rice in salty carbage-leaf, having the shape of an egg. It is used often as Christmas food. Kichí (Kozanitiko kichí) is another local dish, which is actually a cheese pie with circular-snail form.

Notable people

 Ioannis Amanatidis (b. 1981), footballer
 Nikolas Asimos (1949–1988), composer and singer of self-defined musical style "krok"
 Elias Atmatsidis (b. 1969), football goalkeeper
 Evripidis Bakirtzis (1895–1947), military officer and member of Greek Resistance during WWII.
 Anna Diamantopoulou (b. 1959), civil engineer, politician, and former EU Commissioner, for Employment and Social Affairs, in the Prodi Commission
 Eleftherios Foulidis (1948), Orthodox Christian iconographer
 Georgios Lassanis (1793–1870), scholar and politician
 Giorgos Papakonstantinou (b. 1961), economist and former Minister for Finance of Greece
 Michalis Papakonstantinou (1919–2010), lawyer, author and former Minister for Foreign Affairs (1992–1993)
 Georgios Parakeimenos, educator
 Christos Rafalides (b. 1972), jazz vibraphonist, composer, and jazz-music educator
 Georgios Sakellarios (1765–1838), educator
 Ieroklis Stoltidis (b. 1975), footballer
 Apostolos Telikostoglou (b. 1995), taekwondo practitioner
 Chrisanthos Theodoridis (1934–2005), songwriter and singer of pontic music
 Ioannis Topalidis (b. 1962), former football player, assistant manager of the Greece national football team.
 Panos Tzavelas (1925–2009), member of Greek Resistance during WWII, and musician influenced by communist themes

Sports
 Kozani FC (Greek Third Division, 1st group)

International relations

Kozani is twinned with:

 Bristol, Connecticut, USA, since November 2, 1987
 Iaşi, Romania
 Toluca, Mexico
 Turgovishte, Bulgaria, since 2002

See also
 Enteka dance
 I Army Corps of the Hellenic Army
 Kozani National Airport "Filippos"
 Kozani Municipal Stadium
 Krokos Kozanis
 Lake Polyfytos Bridge

References

External links

 Municipality of Kozani
 Prefecture of Kozani
 Region of Western Macedonia
 University of Western Macedonia
 TEI of Western Macedonia
 https://web.archive.org/web/20071125102440/http://www.macedonian-heritage.gr/HellenicMacedonia/en/C3.6.html
 Find all events in Kozani

 
1392 establishments in Europe
Aromanian settlements in Greece
Greek prefectural capitals
Greek regional capitals
Municipalities of Western Macedonia
Populated places in Kozani (regional unit)
Provinces of Greece